Yellowdirt is an unincorporated community in Heard County, Georgia, United States.

History
A post office called Yellow Dirt was established in 1877, and remained in operation until 1904. The community took its name from nearby Yellowdirt Creek.

References

Unincorporated communities in Heard County, Georgia
Unincorporated communities in Georgia (U.S. state)